Marilyn Fay Neufville (born 16 November 1952) is a retired sprint runner who was active between 1967 and 1971. Neufville broke the world record in the 400 m and won four gold medals and one bronze in various regional championships. Born in Jamaica, she emigrated at eight years old to Great Britain.

British years
Marilyn gained three Women's AAA titles as a junior in the 100 yds and 150 yds in the under 15s category in 1967 and won the 220 yds in the under 17 category in 1968. In 1969, she was second at the Women's AAA Championships behind Dorothy Hyman in the 200 m, where she ran 24.3 seconds. Marilyn first appeared on the international scene in September 1969, when she ran the 4 × 400 m in a Great Britain vs West Germany match in Hamburg. In March 1970, she competed for Great Britain in the European Indoor Athletics Championships and won gold over 400 m in 53.01, breaking her outdoor PB of 54.2 and the world indoor record, as well as the UK National Junior Indoor Record which stood until February 2019 when Amber Anning ran 53.00 dead. Later in 1970, she won the WAAA outdoor title at the same distance in 52.6.

Jamaican years
In the summer, before the 1970 British Commonwealth Games in Edinburgh Marilyn chose to represent her country of birth, Jamaica over her country of residence. This caused wide controversy with many members of the British public saying she had betrayed where she was trained and considered her switch like treason. At the Commonwealth Games Neufville established a new world record by improving the preceding mark previously held by the Frenchwomen Colette Besson and Nicole Duclos with 51.0 (electronically timed as 51.02) at the age of 17. This made her the first and so far only Jamaican female athlete to break an outdoor world record. In 1970, she gained more recognition at ISTAF athletics meet in Berlin  then at the AAA championships running 52.6 in front of Germany's Christel Frese and Inge Eckhoff. In 1971, in the indoor AAA championships, Marilyn was beaten by Jannette Champion which reversed the result of the previous year. The same year, in the Pan-American Championships in Cali, she gained her third gold medal and bronze in the 4 × 400 m. At the 1971 Central American and Caribbean Championships she won a fourth gold medal. Her successes earned  her two Jamaica Sportswoman of the year awards in 1970 and 1971. In 1972, she enrolled at the University of California, Berkeley.  She is still ranked number 3 on the school's all-time list.  After battling with injuries Marilyn returned at the 1974 British Commonwealth Games but was a shadow of her former self only finishing sixth in the 400 m final. In the 1976 Summer Olympics Neufville made her Olympic debut finishing fourth in her heat but had to pull out of her round 2 heat through injury.

Trivia
Despite being World Record Holder and Commonwealth champion when she was 17 she did not make her Olympic debut until she was 24.
She was a member of Cambridge Harriers and as of May 2021, still holds that club's U20 400m record of 51s set at the Commonwealth Games in Edinburgh on 23 Jul 1970.

Honours

European Athletics Indoor Championships
1970 European Athletics Indoor Championships in Vienna, Austria 
Gold medal 400 m

British Commonwealth Games
1970 British Commonwealth Games in Edinburgh, Scotland
Gold medal 400 m
5th place 4 × 100 m
1974 British Commonwealth Games in Christchurch, New Zealand
6th in the 400 m

Pan-American Games
1971 Pan American Games in Cali, Colombia 
Gold medal 400 m
Bronze medal 4 × 400 m

Central American and Caribbean Championships
1971 Central American and Caribbean Championships in Athletics in Kingston, Jamaica 
Gold Medal 400 m

World records
The 400 m world record of 51.02 on 23 July 1970 in Edinburgh (improvement of the world record set by Colette Besson and Nicole Duclos), was equalled by Monika Zehrt and Mona-Lisa Pursiainen then beaten by Irena Szewińska in 1974.
400 m world indoor record in 53.01 in March 1971 in Vienna broken by Nadezhda Ilyina in 1974.

References

Further reading

External links
 Marilyn Neufville on Sporting Heroes
 Commonwealth Games 1970 Women's 400m
 Olympic Results
 

1952 births
Living people
British female sprinters
Jamaican female sprinters
Olympic athletes of Jamaica
California Golden Bears women's track and field athletes
Athletes (track and field) at the 1976 Summer Olympics
Athletes (track and field) at the 1970 British Commonwealth Games
Athletes (track and field) at the 1971 Pan American Games
Athletes (track and field) at the 1974 British Commonwealth Games
Commonwealth Games medallists in athletics
Commonwealth Games gold medallists for Jamaica
Pan American Games gold medalists for Jamaica
Pan American Games bronze medalists for Jamaica
Pan American Games medalists in athletics (track and field)
World record setters in athletics (track and field)
People from Portland Parish
Jamaican emigrants to the United Kingdom
Medalists at the 1971 Pan American Games
Olympic female sprinters
Medallists at the 1970 British Commonwealth Games